, also known by his Chinese style name , was a bureaucrat of Ryukyu Kingdom.

Anken was born to an aristocrat family called Mō-uji Ikegusuku Dunchi. He was the eldest son of Ikegusuku Ansei. Later, he became the sixth head of this family.

Anken served as a member of sanshikan from 1670 to 1690. He was dispatched to Satsuma for several times. He was sent to China together with Ō Minsa (also known by Kokuba Pekumi ) as a gratitude envoy for King Shō Tei's investiture in 1683.

References

1635 births
1695 deaths
Ueekata
Sanshikan
People of the Ryukyu Kingdom
Ryukyuan people
17th-century Ryukyuan people